The men's shot put event at the 2007 European Athletics U23 Championships was held in Debrecen, Hungary, at Gyulai István Atlétikai Stadion on 12 July.

Medalists

Results

Final
12 July

Qualifications
12 July
Qualifying 17.95 or 12 best to the Final

Group A

Group B

Participation
According to an unofficial count, 21 athletes from 14 countries participated in the event.

 (1)
 (1)
 (2)
 (1)
 (1)
 (3)
 (2)
 (3)
 (2)
 (1)
 (1)
 (1)
 (1)
 (1)

References

Shot put
Shot put at the European Athletics U23 Championships